The 2006 Derby City Council election took place on 4 May 2006 to elect members of Derby City Council in England. One third of the council was up for election and the Labour Party lost their majority on the council to no overall control.

The Labour party had regained a majority of one on the council after a gain from the Liberal Democrats in a July 2005 by-election in Abbey ward. However they were expected to lose control of the council in the 2006 election. The campaign saw controversy over the Conservative candidate for Sinfin ward, Randeep Kaur Samra, who was under the legal age of 21 for standing in the election, leading to other political parties demanding an apology from the Conservatives.

The results saw the Liberal Democrats gain three seats from Labour to deprive them of their majority, although Labour gained one seat from the Conservatives. Overall turnout was 35.2% and talks followed the election to decide who would run the council. These resulted in an agreement between Labour and the Conservatives, which meant Labour would continue to form the administration but with the Conservatives taking 3 of the 10 seats in the cabinet.

After the election, the composition of the council was:
Labour 24
Liberal Democrat 15
Conservative 11
Independent 1

Election result

Ward results

Abbey

Allestree

Alvaston

Arboretum

Blagreaves

Boulton

Chaddesden

Chellaston

Darley

Derwent

Littleover

Mackworth

Mickleover

Normanton

Oakwood

Sinfin

Spondon

References

2006 English local elections
2006
2000s in Derby